The 1976 NCAA Men's Division I Swimming and Diving Championships were contested in March 1976 at the Smith Swimming Center at Brown University in Providence, Rhode Island at the 53rd annual NCAA-sanctioned swim meet to determine the team and individual national champions of Division I men's collegiate swimming and diving in the United States. 

USC once again topped the team standings, the Trojans' third consecutive title and eighth overall.

Team standings
Note: Top 10 only
(H) = Hosts
(DC) = Defending champions
Full results

See also
List of college swimming and diving teams

References

NCAA Division I Men's Swimming and Diving Championships
NCAA Division I Swimming And Diving Championships
NCAA Division I Swimming And Diving Championships
March 1976 sports events in the United States